Ribeirão Pires–Antônio Bespalec is a train station on CPTM Line 10 (Turquoise), located in the city of Ribeirão Pires.

History
On 28 June 1861, Antonio José de Moraes sold part of Sítio Ribeirão dos Pires to the railway. This, in turn, had belonged to José Alves Siqueira, who died in 1845, and his widow Francisca Alves Bicudo. It was in this area where later  the warehouse and the station were built. On 16 February 1867, with connection São Paulo–Santos to the railway, it inaugurated the temporary traffic, being the current city of Ribeirão Pires a strategical point of stop for water supply of the steam locomotives. The railway branch has already been projected in 1862 by engineer Daniel Makinson Fox the idealizer of the tilted surfaces of the mountain range. The idealized track is the same of the existing one connecting Rio Grande da Serra to Mogi das Cruzes, passing through Ribeirão Pires, branch still active of cargo transportation.

But Ribeirão Pires station was opened only on 1 March 1885. The station worked next to the current one, in a still existing building, the Warehouse. Around the station there were already some Italian immigrants, but the residents were mostly German and the activities that predominated were potteries and wood extraction, but created, in February 1887, the Italian Immigrants Colony.

The village around the station grew a lot, and became a city in 1953. Just like Rio Grande da Serra, the station is the same since the beginning of the century. Today, the CPTM commuter trains attend it.

In 2013, the station was renamed to Ribeirão Pires–Antônio Bespalec after Antônio Bespalec, architect, urbanist, and Secretary of Environment during the administration of former Mayor Clóvis Volpi. Bespalec died in 2008.

References

Companhia Paulista de Trens Metropolitanos stations
Railway stations opened in 1885